Charleston Bar is a series of submerged shoals lying about eight miles southeast of Charleston, South Carolina, United States.

See also
 Battle of Sullivan's Island

Bar
Shoals of the United States
Landforms of Charleston County, South Carolina